The Billy's Creek Bridge is a historic vertical-lift bridge located just east of downtown Fort Myers, Florida.  It carries westbound traffic of State Road 80 (known as Palm Beach Boulevard on the west side and First Street on the east side) across Billy's Creek.  It carried State Road 80 in both directions before eastbound traffic was rerouted onto the adjacent Second and Seaboard Streets.

The bridge was built in 1941.  As a vertical lift bridge, it has four short towers that house the lift mechanisms, which is a unique design for lift bridges.  The bridge has the distinction of being both the smallest vertical lift bridge in Florida and the only hydraulically-powered vertical lift bridge in Florida.  The lift has not been operational since 1987.  The bridge was rehabilitated in 2013.

References

Buildings and structures in Fort Myers, Florida
Bridges in Lee County, Florida
Road bridges in Florida
Bridges completed in 1941
Vertical lift bridges in the United States
Towers in Florida
1941 establishments in Florida